The Old City Hall of Jerez de la Frontera (Spanish: Antiguo Ayuntamiento de Jerez de la Frontera) is a building located in Jerez de la Frontera, Spain. It was declared Bien de Interés Cultural in 1943.

See also 
 List of Bien de Interés Cultural in the Province of Cádiz

References

External links 

Bien de Interés Cultural landmarks in the Province of Cádiz
City and town halls in Spain
Buildings and structures in Jerez de la Frontera